Ligeria latigena is a North America species of fly in the family Tachinidae.

References

Insects described in 1985
Diptera of North America
Exoristinae